Beard v. Kindler, 558 U.S. 53 (2009), is a United States Supreme Court case that deals with the federal review of state laws, known as the adequate and independent state ground doctrine.

Background 
Joseph Kindler was convicted of murder in the state of Pennsylvania, and the jury recommended death. Kindler then challenged his conviction and sentence, but before the trial court could consider his motions Kindler escaped and fled to Canada. The court in Pennsylvania dismissed his post-verdict motions because of his flight. Canadian authorities ultimately captured Kindler, but pending his extradition to the United States he escaped again, evading capture for more than two years. Eventually, however, he was captured and extradited to the United States after his extradition was held to be valid in Kindler v Canada (Minister of Justice).

Upon his return, Kindler attempted to reinstate his post-verdict motions. The trial court denied these requests, citing Pennsylvania fugitive forfeiture laws. Kindler appealed to the Pennsylvania Supreme Court, arguing that the trial court had erred in not considering the merits of the motions. The Pennsylvania Supreme Court denied his motion. Kindler then requested federal habeas corpus relief and the District Court granted it, determining that the state fugitive forfeiture law did not provide adequate basis to bar federal review.

The United States Court of Appeals for the Third Circuit affirmed, and Pennsylvania petitioned the Supreme Court for certiorari. The Commonwealth argued that Kindler could not seek habeas relief in federal court because a federal court cannot review a state court's interpretation of wholly state law.

Opinion of the Court 
The Court ruled in favor of Pennsylvania, with Chief Justice Roberts delivering the opinion of the court. Under the adequate and independent state ground doctrine the Supreme Court cannot, as a general rule, review a state court's interpretation of state law. The court held that the discretionary nature of a state rule barring judicial review of an appeal or a claim does not in itself make it inadequate to also bar federal review. On remand for further consideration of the issue, the Third Circuit determined that the state court had applied its fugitive forfeiture rule as though it were mandatory, which had not been the rule at the time of Kindler's escape from prison. It reinstated the grant of habeas relief overturning Kindler's death sentence and he was subsequently resentenced to life without parole.

References

External links
 

United States Supreme Court cases
United States Supreme Court cases of the Roberts Court
2009 in United States case law